Raymond Suarez (born 23 January 1963) is a Filipino former professional tennis player.

As a Davis Cup player for the Philippines in the 1980s, Suarez had a 8–6 overall record. His 1988 five-set win over Japan's Toshihisa Tsuchihashi, in the fifth rubber, gave his side a rare victory in tie against the East Asian country.

Suarez took part in qualifying draws for the 1988 Summer Olympics and 1989 Australian Open.

Both of his sons, Justin and Stefan, have played collegiate tennis for Villanova University.

References

External links
 
 
 

1963 births
Living people
Filipino male tennis players
Southeast Asian Games medalists in tennis
Southeast Asian Games silver medalists for the Philippines
Southeast Asian Games bronze medalists for the Philippines
Competitors at the 1985 Southeast Asian Games
Competitors at the 1987 Southeast Asian Games